About 1,702 species of plants live on the Arctic tundra, including flowering plants, short shrubs, herbs, grasses, mosses. These plants are adapted to short, cold growing seasons. They have the ability to withstand extremely cold temperatures in the winter (winter hardiness), and grow and reproduce in summer conditions that are quite limiting.

This decrease is linked to the warming of the Arctic due to climate change.

Adaptations 
Arctic plants have a number of adaptations to the compressed growing season and low temperatures:
 They initiate growth rapidly in the spring, and flower and set seed much sooner than plants that grow in warmer conditions.
 Their peak metabolic rate occurs at a much lower temperature than plants from farther south, but only peaks for a short growing season.
 Some Arctic plants grow close to the ground as cushion plants, which keep the plants close to the warm soil and shield the tender central growing shoot.
 Arctic plants limit their height to be below the snow level. Plants that protrude above the snow are subject to strong winds, blowing snow, and being eaten by caribou, muskox, or ptarmigan.
 Arctic plants can survive very low temperatures because of high concentration of soluble carbohydrates, such as raffinose.
 Reproduction by vegetative propagation is common.

Mosses and lichens are common in the Arctic. These organisms have the ability to stop growth at any time and resume it promptly when conditions improve. They can even survive being covered by snow and ice for over a year.

Effect of climate
Arctic vegetation is largely controlled by the mean temperature in July, the warmest month. Arctic vegetation occurs in the tundra climate, where trees cannot grow. Tundra climate has two boundaries: the snow line, where permanent year-round snow and ice are on the ground, and the tree line, where the climate becomes warm enough for trees to grow. The snow line occurs when all monthly mean temperatures are below . Otto Nordenskjöld proposed that the warmest month must be at 9-0.1 T in Celsius, where T is the temperature of the coldest month.

The July mean temperature is close to 0°C in the coldest areas where Arctic vegetation can grow. At these temperatures, plants are at their metabolic limits, and small differences in the total amount of summer warmth make large difference in the amount of energy available for maintenance, growth and reproduction. As one goes for north to south, the size, horizontal cover, abundance, productivity and variety of plants increases:
 Below , woody plants are absent. 
 From , woody plants grow as prostrate dwarf shrubs. Examples include Dryas sp., and Salix arctica.
Examples include Arctous alpina and Cassiope tetragona.
Examples include Betula nana, Ledum decumbens, Vaccinium uliginosum.
Examples include Betula glandulosa and  Salix glauca.

Because small changes in temperature affect survival, growth, and reproduction of arctic plants, the effects of local microclimates can be significant. Even if the local microclimate cannot maintain temperatures above , some arctic plants and flowers, such as Chamaenerion latifolium, can survive a frost with no damage.

References

Flora of the Arctic